Daniel Alsina Leal (born 10 May 1988) is a Spanish chess Grandmaster (since 2010).

Biography
In 2000–2005 Daniel Alsina Leal represented Spain several times at the World and European Youth Chess Championships in various age group. He was also a multiple medalist of the Catalan Youth Chess Championship and won the Spanish Junior Chess Championship under 18 years in 2006.

In 2005, Daniel Alsina Leal won the International Chess Tournament in Vila de Sant Boi. In 2007, he shared the second place in the International Chess Tournament de Sants, Hostafrancs and La Bordeta in Barcelona. In 2009 in Barcelona, Daniel Alsina Leal achieved his best individual result in chess career, won alone this tournament, being the only player without the title of grandmaster, ahead of in the final classification among others Alexey Dreev, Pavel Tregubov and Ulf Andersson.

Daniel Alsina Leal played for Spain in the Chess Olympiad:
 In 2010, at reserve board in the 39th Chess Olympiad in Khanty-Mansiysk (+4, =2, -1).

In 2008, he was awarded the FIDE International Master (IM) title and received the FIDE Grandmaster (GM) title two years later.

References

External links
 
 
 Daniel Alsina Leal chess games at 365chess.com

1988 births
Living people
Sportspeople from Barcelona
Spanish chess players
Chess grandmasters
Chess Olympiad competitors